The Guatemala national Under-20 football team is the national under-20 age level football team of Guatemala, and represents the nation in under-20 international matches. 

The team qualified to the 2011 U-20 World Cup by finishing in the top 4 of the CONCACAF region at the 2011 CONCACAF U-20 Championship, earning the first participation in a World Cup finals tournament at any level for Guatemala.

History
At the 2011 CONCACAF U-20 Championship held in Guatemala City in March and April 2011, Guatemala advanced to the second round as second of a 3-team series which included Honduras and Jamaica. Guatemala then played a direct elimination quarterfinal match against the United States, and won 2-1 which secured a place in the top four and thus participation in the 2011 U-20 World Cup. The result was considered a significant upset by the international news media as the United States was one of the strongest teams in CONCACAF.

2011 U-20 World Cup
Guatemala was drawn into Group D of the tournament along Nigeria, Croatia, and Saudi Arabia. Their debut match was a 0-5 loss against Nigeria. Following a 6-0 loss to Saudi Arabia, Guatemala defeated Croatia 1-0 to advance to the Round of 16, where they were eliminated by losing 0-1 to Portugal.

2022

2023

Current squad
 The following players were called up for the 2022 CONCACAF U-20 Championship.
 Match dates: 18 June – 3 July 2022
 Caps and goals correct as of:' June 26, 2022 after the match against Canada U20.
 Names in italics denote players who have been capped for the senior team.''

Competitive record

FIFA U-20 World Cup

Current technical staff
 Head coach: Rafael Loredo 
 Assistant coach: Rigoberto Gómez

See also

Guatemala national football team
Guatemala national under-17 football team

References

External links
Soccerway Profile

Under-20
Central American national under-20 association football teams